Fred Marquis (15 June 1899–1957) was an English footballer who played in the Football League for Preston North End and Tranmere Rovers.

References

1899 births
1957 deaths
English footballers
Association football forwards
English Football League players
Rushden Town F.C. players
Lancaster City F.C. players
Preston North End F.C. players
Tranmere Rovers F.C. players